Vladas Vitkauskas (born 7 May 1953 in Viduklė, Raseiniai district in Lithuania) who in 1993 became the first Lithuanian and the first mountaineer from the Baltic states to climb the world‘s highest mountain, Mount Everest.  Between 1993 and 1996 Vitkauskas climbed the Seven Summits.

Vitkauskas is the founder and first president of the Lithuanian Mountaineering Association (1996–1999); founder and chairman of the Everest Foundation, head of the Naturavita health centre; a member of the Lithuanian National Olympic Committee, member of the advisory board of the magazine Santara.

Vitkauskas graduated from Kaunas Polytechnic Institute with a diploma in electronic engineering in 1975.

In 1997, he became the first mountain climber to be awarded the diploma of honour of the International Fair Play Committee for participating in the rescue of the body of Pasang Lhamu, the leader of the Nepalese Women Everest Expedition (1993) from Mount Everest.

Awards
 International Fair Play Committee diploma of honour (1997).
 Medals of the Ministry of Culture and Department of Physical Culture and Sports at the government of the Republic of Lithuania: “For High Sports Achievements” (1993), “For Merits to Lithuanian Sports” (1993, 1998), the gold medal “For merits to Lithuanian sports” (2003).
 Medal of the First Class Order of the Lithuanian Grand Duke Gediminas(1994).
 Olympic Star of the Lithuanian National Olympic Committee (2003).
 Order of Concord “Pro augenda concordia” (2009).

Literature
 . 1994 metų kalendorius. Vilnius, Du Ka, 1993. – Liet., angl.
  / Above the Peaks of the World.  Vilnius, DuKa, 1998. – Liet., angl.
 . Vilnius, Vilniaus universiteto leidykla, 2002.
 My Mountain, My Destiny // P. Cousineau. Soul moments. Berkeley, USA, Conari Press, 1997.
 . // K. Švedas. Geografinių atradimų istorija. Vilnius, Švietimo ir mokslo ministerijos leidybos centras, 1997.
 . // R. Krupickas ir Č. Kudaba. Kaunas, “Šviesa”, 2000.
 . // Ignotas Domeika 1802 – 1889: tarptautinės mokslinės konferencijos darbai. Vilnius, 2002. – Liet., angl.
 ... // Gražina Didelytė mūsų atminty. Sudarytojas Vygandas Čaplikas. Vilnius, Petro ofsetas, 2008.
 . // Stanislovas Moravskis. Nuo Merkinės iki Kauno. Parengė Reda Griškaitė. Vilnius, Vilniaus dailės akademijos leidykla. 2009.
 . // Kalnams pašaukus. Sudarytojas V. Stepulis. Vilnius, 2011.

Sources
 http://www.bernardinai.lt/straipsnis/2012-01-30-vladas-vitkauskas-gyvenimo-kelias-vede-per-kalnus/76112

1953 births
Living people
People from Raseiniai District Municipality
Summiters of the Seven Summits
Lithuanian mountain climbers
Soviet mountain climbers
Lithuanian photographers
Kaunas University of Technology alumni
Recipients of the Order of the Lithuanian Grand Duke Gediminas